Hubley can refer to:

People
 Allan Hubley, contemporary municipal politician in Ottawa, Ontario
 Edward Burd Hubley (1792-1856), member of the U.S. House of Representatives from Pennsylvania
 Emily Hubley, contemporary American filmmaker and animator
 Faith Hubley (1924-2001), American animator, spouse of John Hubley
 Georgia Hubley (born 1960), American percussionist, vocalist, and visual artist
 John Hubley (1914-1977), American animation director and producer, spouse of Faith Hubley
 Libbe Hubley (born 1942), Canadian politician
 Roberta Hubley (born 1941), former Canadian politician
 Season Hubley (born 1951), American actress and singer
 Whip Hubley (born 1957), American actor

Geography
 Hubley, Nova Scotia located in Halifax Regional Municipality, Nova Scotia, Canada
 Hubley Township, Schuylkill County, Pennsylvania
 Mount Hubley (disambiguation), several mountains

Companies
 The Hubley Manufacturing Company, a producer of cast-metal toys